Operation Red Star, officially known as the Red Star Multifaceted Revolutionary Campaign was a 1982 Ethiopian army operation during the Ethiopian Civil War aimed at isolating the eliminating opposition forces such as the EPRP and the EPLF from Eritrea. From February to June of 1982, "Operation Red Star," it saw the deployment of more than 100,000 troops. Despite the operation, the government made no significant gains in Eritrea.

Timeline 
The campaign was announced by the government on 25 January 1981 and was official launched on 16 February. By March, thousands of Ethiopian troops were forced to retreat along the northeastern sea coast to the Sudanese border. In addition, an Ethiopian division was reportedly trapped 15 miles inside Sudan.

Societal aspect of Red Star 
Outside of its operational purpose, it was also designed to rally provincial society economically, politically and culturally. The motto became "Military victory first and then civic action" and even Colonel Mengistu moved the entire Derg to Asmara, the Eritrean capital, to be able to showcase the development campaign for the area. The government cared to rally Eritrean society around the military and the ruling junta.

As a result of poor performance in Red Star, the following August saw a new operation, titled "Red Star II", keep a much lower profile than the original.

See also 

 Fall of the Derg

References 

Ethiopian Civil War
Military operations involving Ethiopia
Eritrean War of Independence